Stagg Chili is a brand of convenience food chili con carne sold by Hormel Foods.  It was introduced in canned form in 1999 with 8 different varieties.  In 2004, five new varieties of the brand were introduced in boxes.

References

Chili con carne
Hormel Foods brands